Kinich Ahau Patera is a patera, or a complex crater with scalloped edges, on Jupiter's moon Io. It is named after the Mayan sun god Kinich Ahau. Dazhbog Patera is located northeast, Amaterasu Patera is located south-southeast, and Manua Patera can be found southwest.

References

Surface features of Io (moon)